"The Hangman's Body Count" is a song by Danish rock band Volbeat. The song was released as the second single from the band's fifth studio album Outlaw Gentlemen & Shady Ladies. The song was performed as part of the band's August 1, 2015 show in Odense, Denmark for a crowd of over 37,000 people, the biggest headline show ever by a domestic rock band in Denmark.

Music video
An animated lyric video was created for the song by Yes Equals Yes.

Track listing

Charts

Year-end charts

Personnel
 Michael Poulsen – vocals, rhythm guitar
 Rob Caggiano – lead guitar
 Anders Kjølholm – bass guitar
 Jon Larsen – drums

References

2013 songs
2013 singles
Volbeat songs
Vertigo Records singles
Universal Records singles
Songs written by Michael Poulsen